Joel Hallikainen (born 11 October 1961 in Turku, Finland) is a Finnish musician and entertainer. Hallikainen worked in Wärtsilä shipyard as a welder in late 1970s and played guitar in a new wave band Korroosio. In 1990 Hallikainen started his solo career as a Schlager singer.

Discography

Albums
Schlager albums

Children albums
1985: Jakke & Jokke: Jakke & Jokke ja lapset
1990: Laulava taikuri telmus
1992: Telmuksen taikatalo
1994: Halipula
2006: Telmus taikatakki
2011: Riemuralli

Gospel albums
2004: ...Mutta suurin niistä on RAKKAUS
2005: Rakkautta etsimässä
2007: Tule rauhan henki
2009: Sanaton ikävä
2012: Kahdet askeleet

Compilation albums
1995: Joel Hallikainen konserttilavalla
1997: 20 suosikkia – Kuurankukka
2003: Kaikki parhaat – 40 hittiä
2007: Surun sillalla (compilation album)
2010: Gospel parhaat (3 CD collection)
2011: Joel Hallikainen: Parhaat (Christmas song collections)

Other collaborations
1998: Kimpasa (with Timo Koivusalo)

References

External links

20th-century Finnish male singers
1961 births
Living people
Musicians from Turku
Finnish people of Romani descent
Gospel singers
Schlager musicians
21st-century Finnish male singers